Hyporhamphus collettei is a halfbeak from the family Hemiramphidae.

The specific name honours the American ichthyologist Bruce Baden Collette.

Found along the Western Atlantic, it is endemic to the nearshore marine waters of Bermuda.

References

collettei
Fish described in 2010